Knyazhevo is a rural locality (a village) in Dvinitskoye Rural Settlement, Sokolsky District, Vologda Oblast, Russia. The population was 15 as of 2002.

Geography 
Knyazhevo is located 47 km northeast of Sokol (the district's administrative centre) by road. Glebovo is the nearest rural locality.

References 

Rural localities in Sokolsky District, Vologda Oblast